Chu Fong-chi (27 June 1948) is a Taiwanese politician who served in the Legislative Yuan from 1990 to 2012.

Education
Chu is of Mainland Chinese descent. She attended National Cheng Kung University and Tamkang University in Taiwan, before continuing graduate studies in the United States. She then became a teacher.

Political career
Prior to her election to the Legislative Yuan, Chu served on the Taoyuan County Council and was active in the China Youth Corps. Within the Kuomintang, Chu has served on the party's Central Standing Committee.

Chu was first elected to the legislature in 1989, and retained her seat though six subsequent elections, defeating Lee Yue-chin in 2008. Chu ended her 2012 reelection campaign after losing a primary.

References

1948 births
Living people
Taoyuan City Members of the Legislative Yuan
Members of the 1st Legislative Yuan in Taiwan
Kuomintang Members of the Legislative Yuan in Taiwan
Members of the 2nd Legislative Yuan
Members of the 3rd Legislative Yuan
Members of the 4th Legislative Yuan
Members of the 5th Legislative Yuan
Members of the 6th Legislative Yuan
Members of the 7th Legislative Yuan
Members of the 8th Legislative Yuan
21st-century Taiwanese women politicians
Academic staff of Tamkang University
National Cheng Kung University alumni
Taiwanese schoolteachers
Taoyuan City Councilors
20th-century Taiwanese women politicians